Deodoro  most commonly refers to:

 Deodoro da Fonseca (1827–1892), President of Brazil

It may also refer to:

 Deodoro (Rio de Janeiro), a neighborhood of Rio de Janeiro (Brazil), and facilities within the neighbourhood: 
 Deodoro Stadium
 Deodoro Aquatics Centre
 Deodoro Olympic Whitewater Stadium
 Deodoro Station

See also 
 Marechal Deodoro (disambiguation)